Purandarpur is a village in Suri II CD block in Suri Sadar subdivision of Birbhum district in the state of West Bengal, India.

Geography

Location
It is situated in between Suri and Bolpur and approximately 8 km from Suri, 11 km from Ahmadpur, 13 km from Sainthia and 28 km from Bolpur Shantiniketan.

CD block HQ
The headquarters of Suri II CD block are located at Purandarpur.

Places of interest
Behira, a tourist destination, is situated 2 km on the way to Bolpur. A very old Kali Mandir (Kali temple), on the bank of Bakreshwar River in a deep forest is the main attraction. There is a Dharmaraj temple in the village, where an annual festival is held regarding the Dharmaraj myths. A Mahaprabhu temple is also there in the village.

Demographics
As per the 2011 Census of India, Purandarpur had a total population of 4,566 of which 2,326 (51%) were males and 2,240 (49%) were females. Population below 6 years was 499. The total number of literates in Purandarpur was 3,204 (78.78% of the population over 6 years).

Transport
The village is located at the connecting point of the roads from Bolpur to Suri and Ahmadpur to Suri. The nearest railway station is at Suri, which is the District headquarters of Birbhum district.

Post Office
Purandarpur has a delivery sub post office, with PIN 731129, under Suri head office. Branch offices having the same PIN are Damdama, Dholitkuri, Gadadharpur, Ikra and Majhigram.

Education
Purandarpur High School, a Bengali-medium co-educational school, was established in 1957. It has facilities for teaching from class VI to class 12. The school has 12 computers and a library of 1,500 books. It is housed in a government building and has a play ground.

Culture
Purandarpur Rural Library, a government-sponsored library, was established in 1940. It has its own pucca building.

Healthcare
There is a primary health centre at Purandarpur with 10 beds.

Gallery

References

Villages in Birbhum district